Sri Lanka has a tradition of presenting passion plays on stage for more than 300 years. Negombo is the main city preserving this form of traditional drama. There is another tradition known as 'Wasapuwa' performing Saint Sebastian's life story which is very popular among Christians as well as  non Christians in Sri Lanka.

Passion play in Duwa Negombo
The Duwa passion play has a full-day programme on Good Friday. It could be the oldest and the best known Catholic pageant in Sri Lanka, coming down from generation to generation with well-preserved traditions. The Duwa passion play, with a history of around 400 years, carries a legend, too. It is also a fact that Duwa passion play is the oldest or the second oldest passion play still performed in the world after Oberammergau Passion play. The astonishing miraculous statue of Christ formed the centerpiece of the Passion of Christ in Duwa during the last 150 to 175 years.

In the original form, the play was enacted with statues alone and it was based on the script by Fr Jacome Gonzalvez. In 1948 when Kalasoori Fr Merciline Jayakody became the parish priest, Church of Our Lady of Good Voyage, Duwa, he introduced a new script and humans, instead of statues, for most of the cast. At that time the colourful Duwa passion play had over 250 actors, all drawn from the island hamlet of Duwa, and was considered as the greatest Ppassion show in Asia.

Yagaya (passion play) 1990/92 at Kandawala, Negombo 
Yagaya is a passion play that brought many stage drama ethics in to the folk passion play tradition. It was directed by Sunil Costa, written by Alocius Induruwa, and organised by Kandawala parish in the 1990s.  ,

Aho mage Senageni at Halpe Katana
In 2000  Katana Negombo presented a grand passion play named Aho mage senageni. It was directed by Alexius Fernando (Wadduwa). In this play, they had an opportunity to use costumes from the Oberammergau passion play in Germany. It's the first time that costumes from the world's oldest passion play were given to a Sri Lankan passion play. The music score for this drama has been created by Dinesh Subasinghe in 2003, 2007 and 2013. Vocalist Thushari Fernando in the parish has given some outstanding support from her soprano vocals. Rev. Fr. Laurance Martin gave a great contribution to this drama in the beginning. More than 250 cast participated on this project in each Easter season which this stage play has performed

Kurusiya Matha Miyadunemi (modern passion play)
In the 1990s, Sri Lankan dramatist Peter Wellambage, composer Dinesh Subasinghe, and Jayantha Modarage initiated a big change to the Sri Lankan traditional passion play by bringing in modern drama ethics, in the years 1999, 2000, 2001 at Katuwapitiya and Bolawalana villages in Negombo.

Music
Rev. Fr. Merceline Jayakody was a memorable composer for several passion plays, and his tunes were very popular among Christians in Sri Lanka. Well known musician J.K.S. Perera was another versatile composer for passion plays; he has done music for the Nainamadama passion play and collaborated with the Boralasssa passion play. Lesly Rafayel has composed music for the Yagaya passion play done by Kadnawala parish.

In 21st composer Dinesh Subasinghe contributed a pivotal role for the betterment of passion play music of Sri Lanka by combining world music styles (such as Gregorian chants, western classical music, and Portuguese sounds) with Sri Lankan folk pasun tunes. Dinesh has done scores for 16 passion plays up to 2013. Dinesh re-orchestrated the music of  Duwa's historical passion play in 2009. He also composed music for Katu Otunna re modification: It's  a popular stage drama based on the story of Jesus which was directed by Clement Fernadao, a student of Prof. Edhiriweera Sarathchandra. The main folk tunes of this play were sung by Sri Lankan vocalist Nanda Malini.

Thambakande Paskuwa 2012: St. Bruno church passion play
In 2012 for the first time in the history, many leading cinema and TV stars in Sri Lanka participated in 'Sri Kurusalokanaya / Thambakande Paskuwa 2012' passion play which was produced by Prem Fernando and coordinated by veteran Sri Lankan film star Cletus Mendis. Rev. Fr. Stanly Peris was the spiritual master who gave guidance to the play under instructions of Rt. Rev. Harold Anthony Perera, bishop of Kurunegala.

A senior minister of the present government of Sri Lanka and veteran actor Jeewan Kumaranatunga played the role of Jesus and the haunting musical score was created by Dinesh Subasinghe; his music brought an outstanding depth. Maureen Charuni, veteran cinema actress, played the role of Maria while Neeta Fernando, Cletus Mendis, Richard Weerakkody, Roy de Silva, Sumana Amarasinghe Kanchana Mendis, Tennyson Cooray, Mahesh Jayasinghe, Sunil Liyanarachchi, Rohitha Perera, Ghananga Gunawardena, Boniface Fernando, Shelton Muthunamage, Eardly Wedamuni, Rohana Samansiri and Sunil Costa, all of whom are veterans of the silver screen, also participated. Cristina Fernando a newcomer who played the dual characters of Veronica and Avarjana came for high praise of all present.

This play was directed by dramatist Peter Wellambage. Veteran Catholic church critic Rev. Fr. Earnest Poruthota wrote to the media with copies to the Bishop of Kurunegala highly appreciating the drama, equaling it as the Sri Lankan version of the world-famous passion plays in the world giving highest possible compliments. This play creates history in many ways:
 This is the first passion play in the world with the highest number of senior artists of the silver screen participating.
 This is the first time that a cabinet minister of a country portrayed the character of Jesus Christ live on a stage in any part of the world.

Tharakayano: The first ballet-style passion play (2012)
For the first time in 400 years of world passion play history, the people in Negombo (Sri Lanka), mostly Catholics, witnessed an entirely innovative change concerning the biblical content and the form of the passion play tradition with the successful dramatic presentation of a performance in ballet style titled “Tharakayano” on 29 April 1016 at Kadolkele grounds Negombo. “Tharakayano” is the Sinhala name given to Jesus Christ.

Nearly 250 boys and girls perform characters in 'Tharakayano'. Namal Weveldeniya plays a pivotal role as the choreographer. He is a professional in choreography and a teacher of a leading school in Colombo. Dr. Prabath Aloka is the director and the music composer. He was also the producer of drama on Jacome Gonsalvez directed by Krishantha Warnakula from Negombo. Ranil Fernando, the versatile sculptor of Christian statues, is the stage director and costume designer. Wijith Rohan, a senior lecturer attached to the department of Christian Culture of the Faculty of Humanities in the University of Kelaniya, scripted ‘Tharakayano.’

In keeping with the age-old passion play tradition, “Tharakayano” begins with the creation story and the fall of Adam and Eve as depicted in the book of Genesis in the Bible. Much emphasis is given to the story of Exodus which is the real passion story of the Bible. It is Jesus, the new Moses, who liberates the oppressed people of the world as God brought freedom to the slaves of Israel through Moses by releasing them from the fetters of the oppressor, the Egyptian king, Pharaoh. The ‘Crossing of the Red Sea’ is the Passover from slavery to freedom, ‘Tharakayano’ ends with the scene on the ‘Road to Emmaus’ which depicts the resurrection and the ascension of Jesus.

Passion play villages

In Negombo
Duwa
Pitipana
Kandawala, Negombo
 Katana 
Boralassa
Nainamadama
Murthana
Bolawalana
Katuwapitiya
Dalupotha
Kapungoda
Seeduwa
Chillaw
mattakotuwa
Wennapuwa
Palansena
Kochikade

Close to Colombo
Waaduwa
Moratuwa
Nagoda
Kandana

References

External links
Duwa Passion play
'Tharakayano' Ballad Passion play

Passion plays
Theatrical genres
Sri Lankan drama